Bobby Brown (born 1969) is an American R&B singer.

Bobby, Bobbie or Bobbi Brown may also refer to:

People

Entertainment
Bobbie Brown (born 1969), American actress, model, and Miss Louisiana Teen USA 1987
Bobbi Kristina Brown (1993–2015), American media personality and daughter of Whitney Houston and Bobby Brown
Millie Bobby Brown (born 2004), English actress and model

Sports

Association football
Bobby Brown (footballer, born 1887), English footballer
Bobby Brown (footballer, born 1923) (1923–2020), Scottish goalkeeper and manager
Bobby Brown (footballer, born 1931) (1931–2019), Scottish full back
Bobby Brown (footballer, born 1940), English centre forward in the 1960s with Northampton and Cardiff
Bobby Brown (footballer, born 1953), English midfielder for Sheffield Wednesday
Bobby Brown (footballer, born 1955), Scottish full back, Son of Bobby Brown (footballer, born 1931)

Other sports
Bobby Brown (wide receiver) (born 1977), American football player
Bobby Brown III (born 2000), American football defensive lineman
Bobby Brown (third baseman) (1924–2021), American baseball player and executive
Bobby Brown (outfielder) (born 1954), American baseball player
Bobby Brown (basketball) (born 1984), American basketball player
Bobby Brown (freestyle skier) (born 1991), American freeskier

Other people 
Bobbi Brown (born 1957), American makeup artist and author
Bobbi Brown, wife of Wyoming U.S. Senator John Barrasso
Bobbie E. Brown (1903–1971), World War II Congressional Medal of Honor recipient

Other uses 
 "Bobby Brown" (song), a 1979 song from the Frank Zappa album Sheik Yerbouti
 Bobby Brown State Park, a Georgia state park near the South Carolina border

See also
Bob Brown (disambiguation)
Rob Brown (disambiguation)
Robby Brown (disambiguation)
Robert Brown (disambiguation)
Robert Browne (disambiguation)

Brown, Bobby